Jack Shorten may refer to:

 Jack Shorten (Australian rules footballer) (1887–1958), played for Collingwood
 Jack Shorten (Gaelic footballer) (1886–1972), played for Cork

See also
 Jack Shore
 Jack Short (disambiguation)